Lloyd Upsdell is a Paralympian athlete from Great Britain competing mainly in category T35 sprint events.

Lloyd competed successfully at the 2000 Summer Paralympics in Sydney taking gold in both the T35 100m and 200m before combining with his British teammates to win a silver medal in the T38 Relay.  Four years later were not quite as successful attempting to defend his two gold medals he ended up only winning a bronze in the 200m.

External links
 profile on paralympic.org

Paralympic athletes of Great Britain
Athletes (track and field) at the 2000 Summer Paralympics
Athletes (track and field) at the 2004 Summer Paralympics
Paralympic gold medalists for Great Britain
Paralympic silver medalists for Great Britain
Paralympic bronze medalists for Great Britain
British male sprinters
Living people
Medalists at the 2000 Summer Paralympics
Medalists at the 2004 Summer Paralympics
Year of birth missing (living people)
Paralympic medalists in athletics (track and field)